Group B was one of two groups of the 2021 IIHF World Championship. The four best placed teams advanced to the playoff round.

Due to COVID-19 pandemic protocols, the tournament was held in a "bubble" behind closed doors with no spectators. Prior to the beginning of the tournament, and against objections by Prime Minister Arturs Krišjānis Kariņš and Minister of Health, Daniels Pavļuts, the Latvian parliament voted in favour of a notion ordering the government to develop a plan for allowing spectators who are either fully vaccinated or otherwise immune due to recent infection.

Standings

Matches
All times are local (UTC+3).

Germany vs Italy

Canada vs Latvia

Norway vs Germany

Finland vs United States

Latvia vs Kazakhstan

Norway vs Italy

Kazakhstan vs Finland

Canada vs United States

Latvia vs Italy

Germany vs Canada

United States vs Kazakhstan

Finland vs Norway

Kazakhstan vs Germany

Canada vs Norway

United States vs Latvia

Finland vs Italy

Kazakhstan vs Canada

Latvia vs Norway

Italy vs Kazakhstan

Norway vs United States

Germany vs Finland

Italy vs Canada

Finland vs Latvia

United States vs Germany

Norway vs Kazakhstan

Canada vs Finland

Italy vs United States

Germany vs Latvia

References

External links
Official website

A